Maxine Gordon is a British actress. She played Jane Edmonds in the 1972 Sidney Lumet film The Offence. 

She also had roles in ...And Mother Makes Five, The Canal Children, the ITV series Crossroads, and the drama series Midnight is a Place. She had a small part in "Stigma", a 1977 episode of the BBC series A Ghost Story for Christmas.

References

External links

British actresses
British stage actresses
British film actresses
British television actresses
Living people
Year of birth missing (living people)